Utricularia firmula is a small annual carnivorous plant that belongs to the genus Utricularia. It is native to tropical and southern Africa, where it can be found in Angola, Cameroon, Côte d'Ivoire, the Democratic Republic of the Congo, Ghana, Guinea, Guinea-Bissau, Kenya, Liberia, Madagascar, Malawi, Mali, Mozambique, Nigeria, Senegal, Sierra Leone, South Africa, Sudan, Tanzania, The Gambia, Togo, Uganda, Zambia, and Zimbabwe. It typically flowers toward the end of the wet season. It was originally named by Friedrich Welwitsch but formally described and published by Daniel Oliver in 1865.

See also 
 List of Utricularia species

References 

Carnivorous plants of Africa
Carnivorous plants of Asia
Flora of Angola
Flora of Cameroon
Flora of Ivory Coast
Flora of Ghana
Flora of Guinea
Flora of Guinea-Bissau
Flora of Kenya
Flora of Liberia
Flora of Madagascar
Flora of Malawi
Flora of Mali
Flora of Mozambique
Flora of Nigeria
Flora of Senegal
Flora of Sierra Leone
Flora of South Africa
Flora of Sudan
Flora of Tanzania
Flora of the Democratic Republic of the Congo
Flora of the Gambia
Flora of Togo
Flora of Uganda
Flora of Zambia
Flora of Zimbabwe
firmula
Taxa named by Daniel Oliver